Dan is an ancient city mentioned in the Hebrew Bible, described as the northernmost city of the Kingdom of Israel, and belonging to the tribe of Dan.

The city is identified with a tell located in Upper Galilee, northern Israel, known as Tel Dan ("Mound of Dan") in Hebrew.

Identification and names
The Hebrew Bible states that prior to its conquest by the tribe of Dan the site was known as Laish with variant spellings within the Books of Joshua, Judges and Isaiah. In  it is called Leshem, which means "jewel".  has the alternative name Laishah in a number of translations.

Rabbinic works, and writers like Philostorgius, Theodoret, Benjamin of Tudela and Samuel ben Samson, all incorrectly identified Dan or Laish, with Banias (Paneas). Eusebius of Caesarea more accurately places Dan/Laish in the vicinity of Paneas at the fourth mile on the route to Tyre.

19th century Swiss traveler Johann Ludwig Burckhardt identified the source of the Jordan river having the name "Dhan" in his travelogue published posthumously in 1822. The American naval officer William F. Lynch was the first to identify Tell el-Qadi as the site of the ancient city of Dan in 1849. Three years later, Edward Robinson made the same identification, and this identification is now securely accepted.

Tel Dan is the modern Israeli name for the site, based on the original Biblical name.

Geography

Dan is situated in the area known as the Galilee Panhandle, which is a part of Upper Galilee. To the west is the southern part of Mount Lebanon; to the east and north are the Hermon mountains. Melting snow from the Hermon mountains provides the majority of the water of the Jordan River, and passes through Dan, making the immediate area highly fertile. The lush vegetation that results makes the area around Dan seem somewhat out of place in the otherwise arid region around it. Due to its location close to the border with Syria and Lebanon at the far north of the territory which fell under the British Mandate of Palestine, the site has a long and often bitterly contested modern history, most recently during the 1967 Six-Day War.

Bible and historical context

Laish/Leshem
According to the Book of Judges, prior to the Tribe of Dan occupying the land, the town was known as Laish, meaning lion, or rather lioness. , although telling the same story as Judges 18, names the city as Leshem, which makes the researchers consider it as being the same place.

Laish was allied with the Sidonians. This might indicate they were Phoenicians (Sidonians were Phoenicians from the city of Sidon), who may or may not have been Canaanite. The alliance offered little practical benefit due to the remoteness of Laish from Sidon, and the intervening Lebanon mountains. The town was also isolated from the Assyrians and Aram by the Hermon mountains; the Septuagint mentions that the town was unable to have an alliance with the Aramaeans. The Masoretic Text does not mention the Aramaeans, but instead states that the town had no relationship with any man – textual scholars believe that this is a scribal error, with adham (man) being a mistake for Aram.

Israelite city of Dan

According to Judges concerning Micah's Idol, the Tribe of Dan did not at that point have any territory to their name, and so, after scouting out the land, eventually decided to attack Laish, as the land around it was fertile, and the town was demilitarised. The Bible describes the Tribe of Dan with 600 men brutally defeating the people of Laish and burning the town to the ground, and then building their own town in the same spot. The narrative states that Laish subsequently became known as Dan, after the name of the tribe. They then erected a sanctuary which housed the idol stolen from Micah and served by a priest who was a grandson of Moses. The sanctuary later received one of the two golden calves of Jeroboam, and remained in use until the "time of captivity of the land" and the time that the "house of God" ceased to be in Shiloh. Scholars think that the former refers to the Assyrian conquest of the Kingdom of Israel by Tiglath-pileser III in 733/732 BCE, and that the latter refers to the time of Hezekiah's religious reform; an alternative possibility, however, supported by a minority of scholars, is that "time of captivity of the land" is a scribal error and should read "time of captivity of the ark", referring to the battle of Eben-Ezer, and the Philistine capture of the Ark, and that the ceasing of the "house of God" being in Shiloh refers to this also.

Golden calf worship
Textual scholars believe that this is where the Elohist story of Aaron's Golden calf actually originates, due to opposition in some sections of Israelite society, including the Elohists, to the seeming idol-worship of Jeroboam. However, some Biblical scholars believe that Jeroboam was actually trying to outdo the sanctuary at Jerusalem (Solomon's Temple), by creating a seat for God that spanned the whole kingdom of Israel, rather than just the small space above the Ark of the Covenant in Jerusalem; the seat for God in the Jerusalem sanctuary was represented by a cherub on either side, and so Jeroboam might have been using the calves to represent the sides of his seat for God – implying his whole kingdom was equal in holiness to the Ark.

Archaeology
According to the archaeological excavations at the site, the town was originally occupied in the Late Neolithic period (c. 4500 BCE), and at some time in the fourth millennium BCE it was abandoned for almost 1,000 years.

Bronze Age
Laish was a fortified settlement during the Early Bronze Age. The Egyptians cursed Laish in execration texts written during the Middle Kingdom (21st-17th century BCE), but the repetition in such texts of formulas from older ones dating to the Old Kingdom (27th-22nd century BCE) seem to indicate that they reflected the historical reality of the Early Bronze Age, rather than that of the Middle Bronze Age.

The excavators of Tel Dan uncovered a city gate made of mud bricks on top of megalithic basalt blocs, or orthostats, estimated to have been built during the Middle Bronze Age around 1750 BC. Its popular name is Abraham's Gate, due to the biblical story that Abraham travelled to Dan to rescue his nephew Lot. The gate was restored in the late 2000s, and has become a popular tourist attraction.

In the 15th century BCE, Tuthmosis III conquered the town "ra-wy-sa" along others (Egyptian hieroglyphs did not distinguish between L and R).

Iron Age

During the Iron Age I, Egyptian withdrawal from Canaan led Dan to possibly become an independent entity until the 10th century BCE, when it was annexed by Israel or one of the Aramean kingdoms.

Israelite city wall and gate
The Israelite gate was built at a different location than the Canaanite gate.

In 1992, in order to tidy up the site for presentation to visitors, a heap of debris was removed which dated from the time of the Assyrian destruction of the city by Tiglath-Pileser III in 733/2 BCE. A hitherto unknown earlier gateway to the city was uncovered. The entrance complex led to a courtyard paved with stone with a low stone platform. In the 9th century BCE, the podium was enlarged, and major fortifications were built, a city wall with buttresses and a complex gate. The podium was enlarged further in the 8th century BCE by Jeroboam II, then destroyed by Tiglath-Pileser III.

Seat of king or judge
At the Israelite gate there is a raised square platform reached by two steps. Decorated stone sockets in the corners may have been created to hold canopy poles. It may have been the base of the king's seat, where he would sit in judgment.

Tel Dan Stele
Within the remains of the city wall, close to the entrance of the outer gate, parts of the Tel Dan Stele were found. The basalt stone bears an Aramaic inscription referring to one of the kings of Damascus; the excavators of the site believe that the king it refers to is Hazael (c 840 BCE), though a minority argue that it instead refers to Ben-Hadad (c 802 BCE). A small part of the inscription remains, with text containing the letters 'ביתדוד' (BYTDWD), which some archaeologists agree refers to "House of David" (Beth David in Hebrew.) In the line directly above, the text reads 'MLK YSR'L', i.e. "King of Israel". Hebrew script from the era is vowel-less, which would make the inscription the first time that the name David has been found at an archaeological site dating before 500 BCE.

Dan suffered in the era of expansion by the Aramaeans, due to being the closest city to them in the kingdom of Israel. The several incursions indicated by the Book of Kings suggest that Dan changed hands at least four times between the Kingdom of Israel and Aramaeans, around the time that Israel was ruled by Ahab and the Aramaeans by Ben Hadad I, and their successors. Around this time, the Tel Dan stele was created by the Aramaeans, during one of the periods of their control of Dan.

When the Assyrian empire expanded to the south, the kingdom of Israel initially became a vassal state, but after rebelling, the Assyrians invaded and the town fell to Tiglath-Pileser III in 733/732 BCE.

Cultic area, altar
The cultic area, connected for a while to the worship of the golden calf, was centred on a raised altar.

Later periods
During the Persian, Hellenistic, and Roman periods, remains indicate that cultic activities continued around the podium (also known as "the High Place").

Tel Dan Nature Reserve
The Tel Dan Nature Reserve was first declared on 39 hectares surrounding the tel in 1974. 9 hectares were added to the reserve in 1989. The Dan River is one of the three water sources of the Jordan River which meet in the northern part of the Hula Valley. Notable points of interest include Paradise Springs, the Abraham or Canaanite Gate and the Israelite Gate.

References

Bibliography
 Re-accessed 20 July 2022.

External links

Tel Dan Excavations – official Nelson Glueck School of Biblical Archaeology website
Tel Dan inscription
Israel Nature & Natural Parks Protection Authority Site
 1961 Israeli map of Tel Dan and surrounding area. 

Megalithic monuments in the Middle East
Nature reserves in Israel
Prehistoric sites in Israel
Ancient sites in Israel
Former populated places in Southwest Asia
Land of Israel
Bronze Age sites in Israel
Iron Age sites in Israel
Canaanite cities
Protected areas of Northern District (Israel)
Buildings and structures in Northern District (Israel)
Tells (archaeology)
Historic Jewish communities
5th-millennium BC establishments
4th-millennium BC disestablishments
Populated places established in the 5th millennium BC
Populated places disestablished in the 4th millennium BC
Populated places disestablished in the 8th century BC
Hula Valley
Tribe of Dan
World Heritage Tentative List
Golden calf
Late Neolithic